The 1990 Brown Bears football team was an American football team that represented Brown University during the 1990 NCAA Division I-AA football season. Brown tied for second-to-last in the Ivy League. 

In their first season under head coach Mickey Kwiatkowski, the Bears compiled a 2–8 record and were outscored 289 to 160. N. Badalato, Greg Patrick and Reid Smith were the team captains. 

The Bears' 2–5 conference record tied for sixth in the Ivy League standings. They were outscored 186 to 129 by Ivy opponents. 

Brown played its home games at Brown Stadium in Providence, Rhode Island.

Schedule

References

Brown
Brown Bears football seasons
Brown Bears football